SPHARM-PDM toolbox is a shape correspondence software package developed by the Neuro Image Research and Analysis Laboratories at the University of North Carolina at Chapel Hill. SPHARM-PDM is a tool that computes point-based models using a parametric boundary description based on spherical harmonics.

Usage
The package can be used in MacOS, Linux and Windows as an external extension of 3DSlicer.

Support
Free registration and installation are available. Documentation can be found on the SPHARM-PDM Wiki and support is available from the developers and community through the SPHARM-PDM forum.

References

External links
 SPHARM-PDM

Digital geometry